Mpalityan (Mpalitjanh) is an Australian language once spoken in the Cape York Peninsula of Queensland. It and Luthigh are dialects of a single language.

Phonology

Consonant Phonemes

Vowel Phonemes

References

Extinct languages of Queensland
Northern Paman languages